Miss International 1965, the 6th Miss International pageant, was held on August 13, 1965 at the Long Beach Municipal Auditorium, Long Beach, California, United States. 43 contestants competed for the pageant. Finally, Ingrid Finger from Germany was crowned as Miss International 1965 by outgoing titleholder, Gemma Cruz from Philippines.

Results

Placements

Special Awards

Contestants

  - Alicia Raquel Arruabarrena
  - Carole Jackson
  - Hannelore Hogn
  - Monique Moret
  - Sandra Penno Rosa
  - Mary Lou Farrell †
  - Christine Muriel de Souza
  - Matilde Erika Von Saint George Gonzalez
  - Regina Salcedo Herrera
  - Ana Koberg
  - Lisbeth Lefeuve
  - Maria Eugenia Mosquera Bañados
  - Carol Crompton
  - Esti Östring
  - Marie-France Perron
  - Ingrid "Fiffi" Finger
  - Vivi Niavi
  - Bennett Ann Crisostomo
  - Elaine Bollen
  - Rosa Einarsdóttir
  - Elizabeth Black
  - Iris Bar-Or
  - Faida Fagioli
  - Hiroko Fukushima
  - Kim Min-jin (real name: Kim Kyoung-sook)
  - Yvy Georges
  - Linda Lim Hong Eng
  - Janice Esmae Barkley
  - Patricia Estela Mena
  - Aud "Brit" Jansen
  - Silvia García
  - Lola Muro Macher
  - Isabel Barnett Santos
  - Iraida Palacios
  - Anne Snape Smith
  - Diana Webster
  - Rafaela Roque Sánchez
  - Agneta Evelyn Holst
  - Marie Tapare
  - Zerrin Arbas
  - Gail Karen Krielow
  - Thamara Leal
  - Susan Strangemore
  - Wilma Jay Albertha Millien (Port of Spain, Trinidad )

Notes

Withdrawals 
  - No contest held
  - No contest held

Name changes 

External links 
Pageantopolis - Miss International 1965

1965
20th century in Los Angeles County, California
1965 beauty pageants
Beauty pageants in the United States